The 2011 Red Bull MotoGP Rookies Cup season was the fifth season of the Red Bull MotoGP Rookies Cup. The season began at Circuito de Jerez on 2 April and ended on 3 September at the Misano World Circuit after 14 races. The races, contested by the riders on equal KTM machinery, were held at eight meetings on the Grand Prix motorcycle racing calendar.

Calendar
The season saw an expanded calendar, from six meetings up to eight meetings, adding events at Estoril for the first time since 2008, and Silverstone for the first time. Of the eight meetings, six were double-headers, with single races at Mugello and Misano.

Entry list

Championship standings
Points were awarded to the top fifteen finishers, provided the rider finished the race.

References

External links
 Official Site
 Season at FIM-Website

Red Bull MotoGP Rookies Cup
Red Bull MotoGP Rookies Cup racing seasons